The 1904 Southwestern Louisiana Industrial football team was an American football team that represented the Southwestern Louisiana Industrial Institute (now known as the University of Louisiana at Lafayette) as an independent during the 1904 college football season. In their only year under head coach Edwin F. Gayle, the team compiled a 2–0–1 record.

Schedule

References

Southwestern Louisiana
Louisiana Ragin' Cajuns football seasons
College football undefeated seasons
Southwestern Louisiana Industrial football